Nady is an unincorporated community in Arkansas County, Arkansas, United States. It is the location of a National Historic Landmark, the Menard–Hodges site. The environs of Nady, at the southern tip of the Little Prairie, are in the portion of Arkansas that saw the earliest European settlement in what is now the state of Arkansas, including Tonty’s 1686 post. The Menard-Hodges archeological site, about one-half mile southwest of Wallace-Menard-Coose Cemetery, along with the adjacent Wallace Bottom archeological site, appear to be the locations of the late 1600s Quapaw village of Osotouy, Tonty’s 1686 Post, and the early to mid-1700s French Arkansas Post.

The Geographic Names Information System (GNIS) provides the location of the Nady Church at: . GNIS also lists the Nady Post Office (historical) and Sweeney's store at an unknown location.

Residents are zoned to the DeWitt School District, including DeWitt High School.

History
Archaeological investigations at the Menard-Hodges site near Nady in Arkansas County since the late 1800s have yielded information about both Native American and European colonial settlement of the region of the lower Arkansas River. Two large mounds, thirty-nine-foot-tall Mound A and flanking thirteen-foot-tall Mound B, overlook a square plaza some two acres in area, with smaller mounds around the other sides of the plaza. Also adjacent to the plaza are the locations of two nineteenth-century farmsteads of French descendants. The Menard–Hodges site was widely considered to be the location of the first Arkansas Post and also the location of the Quapaw village of Osotouy. However, recent research indicates that while the Menard–Hodges site is an important part of an early historic landscape, the precise locations of the French post and Quapaw village may have been at other locations nearby. The Menard–Hodges site has been damaged by farming, by erosion, and by looters but is now protected as part of the Osotouy Unit of the Arkansas Post National Memorial.

The site location is at the south end of Little Prairie, an outlier of the Grand Prairie, overlooking an abandoned Arkansas River channel. The high ground on Little Prairie was ideal for permanent habitation, in contrast to the seasonally flooded lowlands flanking the Arkansas River up to that point. Pottery, and other artifacts at Menard-Hodges indicate occupation in the Woodland (600 BC–AD 1000), Mississippian (AD 1000–1540) and Protohistoric (AD 1540–1700) periods.

The first Arkansas Post was likely near the Menard–Hodges site. Returning from an unsuccessful attempt to rendezvous with René-Robert Cavelier, Sieur de La Salle at the mouth of the Mississippi River in 1686, Henri de Tonti, La Salle’s second in command, permitted some of his party to establish a trading house on a seigniory (feudal estate) that La Salle had granted to him at the time of their 1682 voyage on the Mississippi. The six Frenchmen built a trading house at the Quapaw village of Osotouy fifteen miles up the Arkansas. The following year, seven survivors of La Salle’s Texas colony, accompanied by Native guides from a village near the Ouachita River, encountered the Frenchmen at their trading house at Osotouy. One of the party, Henri Joutel, recounted their enthusiastic welcome by the Quapaw and left a vivid description of the village.

The Menard–Hodges site appears in modern scholarship with a description in English naturalist Thomas Nuttall’s 1821 published journal of his travels in the Arkansas Territory two years before: “At first view, I thought I discovered a considerable hill, but it was, in fact, an enormous mound, not less than 40 feet high, situated toward the centre of a circle of other lesser mounds, and platforms of earth. The usual vestiges of earthenware, and weapons of hornstone flint, are here also met with, scattered over the surrounding soil.”

Edward Palmer, of the Smithsonian Institution Bureau of American Ethnology Mound Exploration Division, visited Menard on a number of occasions from 1881 to 1883. The land including the Menard site was then owned by Napoleon Bonaparte Menard and his brother, Julius Menard, who lived in separate houses on the site. Palmer described the Menard site as a main mound with two prominent wings and ten smaller, flat-topped mounds nearby. On the lower wing of the large mound (Mound B), Palmer found deposits of fired clay that he interpreted as the burned remains of structures. Excavating burials in low mounds to the south, Palmer found pottery vessels and other artifacts. Examples of these were illustrated in the third annual report of the Smithsonian Institution Bureau of American Ethnology in 1884. These were some of the first ancient Native American artifacts from Arkansas to be reported in published scientific literature.

Clarence B. Moore of Philadelphia followed in Palmer’s steps in 1908. Over twelve days, Moore and his workers excavated 160 burials at locations along the south end of Little Prairie, finding 214 ceramic vessels plus other grave goods. In some of the graves, in addition to pottery vessels and other Native artifacts, they found glass beads and ornaments made of brass or copper, indicating early contact with Europeans. Moore described the areas he excavated as badly eroded and disturbed by farming. Later in the same year, the Academy of Natural Sciences of Philadelphia published Moore’s finds along the Arkansas River in a lavishly illustrated publication that served as the primary source for the archeology in the region over most of the twentieth century.

Philip Phillips and E. Mott Davis of Harvard University excavated test pits at Menard-Hodges in 1941. The excavations demonstrated that not only was the site possibly a seventeenth-century Quapaw village but that it also had been occupied as early as the late Woodland Period (AD 400–1000).

The National Park Service sponsored work at Menard-Hodges in the 1950s to evaluate its suitability, along with the site of the historic town of Arkansas Post near Gillette (Arkansas County), as a park commemorating the importance of the lower Arkansas River region in American history. Preston Holder worked briefly at Menard-Hodges in 1957, and, the following year, James A. Ford of the American Museum of Natural History conducted more-extensive excavations. Reporting results of his Menard investigations in a 1961 monograph, Ford concluded that Menard was the location of the late seventeenth-century Quapaw village of Osotouy and Tonti’s 1686 post, conclusions called into doubt by results of more recent investigations in the locality.

In 1997 and 1998, Menard-Hodges was the scene of two successive Arkansas Archeological Survey/Arkansas Archeological Society training sessions. In each year, more than 100 volunteers worked under the direction of Survey archeologists at Menard-Hodges and the outlying Lake Dumond site. At Menard-Hodges, exploratory test pits were dug in the northern periphery of the site, in the plaza, in the smaller mounds around the plaza, and in two suspected borrow pit areas where soil had been obtained to construct mounds. Excavation on the center of the plaza in 1998 revealed traces of two eight-foot-deep post holes with insertion ramps. These are thought to represent two successive monumental wooden poles central to the site layout. Concurrent work at the Lake Dumond site revealed the graves of Native American children accompanied by late 1600s European trade goods. The children were likely Quapaw who had lived in Osotouy. Another important outcome of the 1997–1998 work in the Menard locality was the discovery of the Wallace Bottom site in the floodplain a short distance away. Wallace Bottom is currently the likeliest candidate for the location of the Quapaw village of Osotouy.

The National Park Service, Midwest Archeological Center, and Arkansas Archeological Survey partnered in 2014–2016 to initiate an inventory of cultural resources in the Osotouy Unit. Work was begun with remote sensing north and east of Mound A to identify geophysical indications of below-ground cultural features. Ground-truthing excavation on these locations the following year exposed pits and other cultural features containing habitation debris including broken pottery and fragments of bone from deer and other animals. The final phase of the project, in 2016, focused on coring in the larger mounds and on dating of samples from selected cultural contexts. The work established that major mound construction at Menard-Hodges may have begun as early as the 1300s.

Members of the Quapaw Tribe of Oklahoma have long-standing interest in Menard-Hodges and nearby sites as possible locations of the late 1600s Quapaw village of Osotouy. Representatives of the tribe participated in the November 2, 1991, National Historic Landmark designation and were on hand for the 1997 Arkansas Archeological Survey/Arkansas Archeological Society excavations at Menard-Hodges and Lake Dumond. At the latter site, the tribal representatives participated in consultations in advance of the excavation of burials. In 2003, employing funds from a National Park Service Tribal Historic Preservation Grant, the Quapaw Tribe supported the Arkansas Archeological Survey’s excavations at the Wallace Bottom Site.

The Menard–Hodges site was placed on the National Register of Historic Places on October 31, 1985. The new name of the site, Menard-Hodges, combined the name of the family that owned the land in the nineteenth century with the names of Dr. Thomas Hodges and his wife, Charlotte, who bought the site in the 1940s to preserve it and who worked hard for recognition of its importance to Arkansas history. Charlotte Hodges sold the site to the Archaeological Conservancy in 1980 to ensure its permanent preservation. Following the authorization of the Osotouy Unit of Arkansas Post National Memorial on November 14, 1997, the National Park Service purchased the site from the conservancy. As of 2021, the Osotouy Unit of Arkansas Post National Memorial is closed to the public.

https://encyclopediaofarkansas.net/entries/menard-hodges-site-1190/

See also
List of National Historic Landmarks in Arkansas
Coose Cemetery - East of Nady Road a mile past the Nady Church

References

Unincorporated communities in Arkansas County, Arkansas
Unincorporated communities in Arkansas

Coose Cemetery